The 2001 Eastern Michigan Eagles football team represented Eastern Michigan University in the 2001 NCAA Division I-A football season. In their second season under head coach Jeff Woodruff, the Eagles compiled a 2–9 record (1–6 against conference opponents), finished in last place in the West Division of the Mid-American Conference, and were outscored by their opponents, 356 to 197. The team's statistical leaders included Kainoa Akina with 1,504 passing yards, Chris R. Roberson with 755 rushing yards, and Kevin Walter with 748 receiving yards. Scott Russell received the team's most valuable player award.

Schedule

References

Eastern Michigan
Eastern Michigan Eagles football seasons
Eastern Michigan Eagles football